The National Youth Council of Slovenia is the national youth council representing all national youth organisations irrespective of their various interests, ideological or political orientations. As a non-profit and non-governmental organisation, it represents the opinions of Slovenian youth at the national and international level.

The key purpose of MSS is to defend the interests of young people and to promote their participation in policy making process in the fields which have a significant impact on their lives and work.

MSS strives to create an environment in which young people can become autonomous, responsible, sympathetic and active individuals and members of society. It also endeavours to improve the position of young people as a specific social group.

References

Youth empowerment organizations
Youth_councils
Organizations_established_in_1990
Youth organizations based in Slovenia
1990 establishments in Slovenia